"Watch" is a song by American rapper Travis Scott featuring fellow American rappers Lil Uzi Vert and Kanye West. Written alongside producer Pi'erre Bourne, it was released by Cactus Jack, Grand Hustle, and Epic Records on May 4, 2018. It was expected to be the second single from Scott's third studio album Astroworld, before being excluded when the album was released on August 3, 2018.

Release
American supermodel and reality star and Travis Scott's girlfriend at the time, Kylie Jenner, first teased the track via her Snapchat story on April 24, 2018, West also teased it on Twitter the following day. A day before the song's release, Scott revealed its release date and cover art, the latter of which includes a roller coaster, a skull with fire in its eye sockets, flowers and a gem-encrusted gold watch. On May 11, Scott premiered a vertical video for the song exclusively on Spotify, in which Uzi and West were absent. It was shot at Six Flags Magic Mountain.

Composition
"Watch" is a trap song which samples Ronald Jenkees' 2012 song "Early Morning May" and KSupreme's unreleased song "Expensive Shit". According to Rolling Stones Althea Legaspi, "the track opens with an amusement park clip of a child at AstroWorld, and a whimsical, woozy musical vibe follows that befits that theme". Lyrically, Uzi raps about their cash flow, while West raps about opioid addiction and addresses his controversial social position. The outro was spoken by Scott's girlfriend Kylie Jenner.

Critical reception
Sheldon Pearce of Pitchfork regarded the song as "an enjoyable ego trip full of empty-calorie raps, reliant entirely on the premise that you are as enthralled by these three artists as they are with themselves". He noted "Pi'erre's superb ear-bending production" as "the song's best feature", writing that "Scott is largely forgettable" due to his "toneless, flat, and unchanging" hums.

Live performances
On May 6, 2018, Scott made a live performance debut of the song during an appearance at Avenue nightclub in Los Angeles.

Personnel
Credits adapted from Tidal.
 Travis Scott – vocals
 Lil Uzi Vert – vocals
 Kanye West – vocals
 Pi'erre Bourne – production
 Jimmy Cash – engineering
 Noah Goldstein – engineering
 Mike Dean – mixing engineering, mastering engineering

Charts

Certifications

Release history

References

External links
 

2018 songs
2018 singles
Epic Records singles
Grand Hustle Records singles
Travis Scott songs
Kanye West songs
Lil Uzi Vert songs
Songs written by Travis Scott
Songs written by Kanye West
Songs written by Lil Uzi Vert
Songs written by Pi'erre Bourne
Vertically-oriented music videos